Upset may refer to:

 Upset (band), an American rock band
 Upset (competition), where a likely winner loses
 "Upset" (Hit the Floor), an episode of the television series Hit the Floor
 Upset (horse), a racehorse
 Upset (wastewater treatment), temporarily decreased effluent quality
 Aircraft upset, a dangerous aviation condition
 Upper set, in mathematics
 UpSet Plot, in data visualization
 Upset forging, a forging process where a workpiece's diameter is increased by compressing its length.
 Upset, a type of fault in wood, see Shakes (timber) § Thunder shake or upset